Chester C. Platt (1869–1934) operated a drugstore in Ithaca, New York, and was credited with the invention of the ice cream sundae. He was the owner of the Ithaca Democrat, the Batavia Times, and the Madison Wisconsin Leader. He was secretary to New York Governor William Sulzer, and was involved in Democratic state and national politics from 1910 to 1920. In Ithaca, he was active in the Unitarian Church and in local politics.

References

External links
 

1869 births
1934 deaths